Pugnus is a genus of very small sea snails, marine gastropod mollusks or micromollusks in the family Granulinidae.

Species
Species within the genus Pugnus include:
Pugnus lachrimula (Gould, 1862)
Pugnus maesae Roth, 1972
Pugnus margaritella Faber, 2006
 Pugnus mirbatensis Cossignani & Lorenz, 2018
Pugnus parvus Hedley, 1896
Pugnus tarasconii Rios, 2009
Species brought into synonymy
Pugnus serrei (Bavay, 1911): synonym of Marginellopsis serrei Bavay, 1911

References

 Boyer F. (2017). Révision de l'organisation supra-spécifique des gastéropodes granuliniformes. Xenophora Taxonomy. 16: 25-38

External links
  Hedley, C. (1896). Description of Pugnus, a new genus of Ringiculidae, from Sydney Harbour. Records of the Australian Museum. 2(7): 105-106

Granulinidae